Vera Elisabeth Telenius (24 September 1912, in Sahalahti – 5 August 1991, in Tampere) was a Finnish singer. Her most successful recording was "Miljoona ruusua" for which she wrote Finnish lyrics for the song "Million alyh roz" originally made famous by Russian singer Alla Pugacheva.

20th-century Finnish women singers
1991 deaths
1912 births